Martha McCabe (born August 4, 1989) is a Canadian competition swimmer. She won bronze in the 200-metre breaststroke at the 2011 World Championships.  At the 2012 Summer Olympics in London, McCabe finished fifth in the final of the 200-metre breaststroke.  At the 2014 Commonwealth Games, she competed in the 100 m and 200 m breaststroke.

In 2016, she was officially named to Canada's Olympic team for the 2016 Summer Olympics again in the 200 m breaststroke.

Martha's Canadian Drive 
After competing at the 2016 Summer Olympics in Rio, Martha embarked on a cross Canada drive to inspire the next generation of athletes by stopping at over 45 swim clubs and schools from Victoria, BC to St. John's, NL. Alongside Matt Bortolussi, the drive spanned 50 days as she spoke to over 3,000 kids, parents, and coaches across the country.

Personal life
In a July 2020 interview with CBC Sports, McCabe came out as a lesbian. She stated in doing so, she hoped to help other young lesbian swimmers who may be struggling with their sexuality.

References

External links
 Swimming Canada Profile

1989 births
Living people
Canadian female breaststroke swimmers
Commonwealth Games competitors for Canada
Olympic swimmers of Canada
Pan American Games silver medalists for Canada
Swimmers from Toronto
Swimmers at the 2010 Commonwealth Games
Swimmers at the 2012 Summer Olympics
Swimmers at the 2014 Commonwealth Games
Swimmers at the 2015 Pan American Games
Swimmers at the 2016 Summer Olympics
UBC Thunderbirds swimmers
World Aquatics Championships medalists in swimming
Pan American Games medalists in swimming
LGBT swimmers
Lesbian sportswomen
Medalists at the 2015 Pan American Games
20th-century Canadian women
21st-century Canadian women